ORP Generał Kazimierz Pułaski is one of two Oliver Hazard Perry-class guided-missile frigates of the Polish Navy. Formerly serving in the United States Navy as the USS Clark (FFG-11), after her transfer to Poland she was named for Kazimierz Pułaski, who fought in both the War of the Bar Confederation in Poland and later the American Revolutionary War. As the USS Clark, she was the US Navy's fifth ship of the Oliver Hazard Perry class, and was named for Admiral Joseph James "Jocko" Clark (1893–1971). The ship is propelled by two General Electric LM-2500 gas turbines and two 350 horsepower (261 kW) electric drive auxiliary propulsion units. The Gen K. Pułaski is currently homeported at Gdynia (Oksywie).

History
Ordered by the US Navy from Bath Iron Works on 27 February 1976 as part of the FY76 program, the USS Clark was laid down on 17 July 1978, launched on 24 March 1979, and commissioned on 9 May 1980. She was the second US Navy ship commissioned as the USS Clark. The ship sponsor was Mrs. Olga Clark, the widow of the ship's namesake.

In July 1982, Clark recovered three sailors that were washed overboard from the aircraft carrier  in the Atlantic Ocean off the coast of Spain. A fourth sailor was not recovered and was lost at sea.

In December 1992, Clark was nearby when the crew of an F-14 was forced to eject during training operations off the coast of Virginia. Clarks helicopter rescued the radar intercept officer and a United States Coast Guard helicopter rescued the pilot.

In April 1994, Clark changed homeports from Newport, Rhode Island, to Norfolk, Virginia. The ship had previously been homeported in Philadelphia, Pennsylvania from the mid-1980s to 1992 and Mayport, Florida before that.

Decommissioned and stricken from the US Navy list on 15 March 2000, she was transferred to the Polish Navy that same day.

The ship was commissioned the ORP Generał Kazimierz Pułaski (after Kazimierz Pułaski) on 25 June 2000, at a ceremony attended by US Secretary of State Madeleine Albright. Commander Marian Ambroziak was the first Polish Commanding Officer. Since her transfer to Poland, the Gen K. Pułaski has participated in numerous NATO exercises in the Baltic Sea.

Awards as the USS Clark

The USS Clark and her crew received the following unit awards, according to the US Navy unit awards website:

 Humanitarian Service Medal for the evacuation of Lebanon, 23 to 25 June 1982
 Armed Forces Expeditionary Medal for Lebanon from 11 December 1983 to 21 January 1984
 US Coast Guard Unit Commendation, 31 October 1984 to 31 December 1984
 Meritorious Unit Commendation, 1 February 1984 to 21 April 1984
 US Coast Guard Special Operations Service Ribbon, three awards, for April to June 1989, July to September 1989 and 19 January 1990 to 24 February 1990.
 Navy E Ribbon, two awards, for the years of 1992 and 1995
 Joint Meritorious Unit Award for the year of 1997.

USS Clark was also nominated for the United States Public Health Service Outstanding Unit Citation for operations from 24 June 1994 to 12 July 1994, but did not receive the award. The ship was reported near Haiti in mid-July 1994 around the time many refugees were fleeing Haiti in small boats.

See also
 USS Pulaski and USS Clark for US Navy ships of a similar name.

References

External links

 Polish Navy official site about Perry class in English
 Polish Navy official web about ORP Pulaski in Polish

1979 ships
Oliver Hazard Perry-class frigates of the Polish Navy
Monuments and memorials to Casimir Pulaski
Ships built in Bath, Maine
Oliver Hazard Perry-class frigates of the United States Navy